Octaviania is a genus of truffle-like fungi in the family Boletaceae. The widespread genus is estimated to contain 15 species.

The genus name honours of Vicenzo Ottaviani (1790–1853), an Italian doctor and mycologist and Professor of Medicine and Botany at University of Camerino. 

The genus was circumscribed by Carlo Vittadini in 1831.

Species
, Species Fungorum (via the Catalogue of Life database) accepts 48 species of Octaviana.
Octaviania aculeatospora 
Octaviania arbucalensis 
Octaviania archeri 
Octaviania asahimontana 
Octaviania asterosperma 
Ottaviania aurea 
Octaviania borneensis 
Octaviania brisbanensis 
Octaviania celatifilia 
Octaviania ciqroensis 
Octaviania cyanescens 
Octaviania decimae 
Octaviania depauperata 
Octaviania durianelloides 
Octaviania etchuensis 
Octaviania foetens 
Octaviania galatheia 
Octaviania glabra 
Octaviania hesperi 
Octaviania hinsbyi 
Octaviania japonimontana 
Octaviania kobayasii 
Octaviania lamingtonensis 
Octaviania levispora 
Octaviania longiana 
Octaviania macrospora 
Octaviania malaiensis
Octaviania moravica 
Octaviania mortae 
Octaviania nigrescens 
Octaviania nonae 
Octaviania odoratissima 
Octaviania olida 
Octaviania pallida 
Octaviania picea 
Octaviania plena 
Octaviania radicans 
Octaviania radicata 
Octaviania sarcomelas 
Octaviania soderstromii 
Octaviania stillingerii 
Octaviania tasmanica 
Octaviania vacekii 
Octaviania violascens 
Octaviania yaeyamaensis 
Octaviania zelleri

References

Boletaceae
Boletales genera